The Sedona Ranger Station was built by the U.S. Forest Service in Sedona, Arizona in 1917 to administer the Red Rock Ranger District of Coconino National Forest. The ranger station complex includes a residence, a barn and a pump house. The house is a wood frame single story bungalow-style building on a sandstone foundation.

In the 1935 the Civilian Conservation Corps built the barn and pumphouse. The barn was built to USFS standard plan R-3-45A-7.

The property was sold before 2008 to private owners. It was placed on the National Register of Historic Places on August 29, 2008.

References

Park buildings and structures on the National Register of Historic Places in Arizona
Government buildings completed in 1917
Buildings and structures in Coconino County, Arizona
United States Forest Service ranger stations
Civilian Conservation Corps in Arizona
1917 establishments in Arizona
National Register of Historic Places in Coconino County, Arizona
Sedona, Arizona